PCQuest is an Indian technology publication, and part of the Cyber Media group of publications that also publish Dataquest.

PCQ Linux 
Since 2001, an initiative has been called PCQLinux, which is not entirely correct, as the name only refers to the customized Linux distribution on the CD, not the initiative to promote and support Open Source technologies. The last PCQLinux was published in 2009 after a user poll.

References

External links
 
 Cyber Media website
Archived PCQuest magazines on the Internet Archive

1982 establishments in Delhi
English-language magazines published in India
Computer magazines published in India
Monthly magazines published in India
Magazines established in 1982